Ricardo Eduardo Naveda de la Puente (23 April 1899 – May 1981), was a Spanish footballer who played as a defender for Athletic Club de Madrid and Racing de Santander.

Club career
Born in Cantabria, he moved to Madrid as a child, where he began to play football. At only 17 years of age, he joined Athletic Club de Madrid in 1916, with whom he played for 4 seasons, forming a great defensive line with José Luis de Goyarrola and Adolfo Álvarez-Buylla, as well as featuring alongside the likes of Pagaza, Juan de Cárcer, Sócrates Quintana and the Villaverde brothers (Fernando and Senén). In 1920, he returned to Cantabria, where he signed for Racing de Santander, with whom he played for 7 years until he retired in 1927, winning five Cantabrian Championship in a row between 1922 and 1927.

International career
As a Athletic Madrid player, he was a member of the Madrid national side, captained by José María Castell, that also included, Joaquín Pascual, Sócrates Quintana, Miguel Mieg, José Agüero and Saturno Villaverde, which against all odds, claimed the trophy in the 1917 Prince of Asturias Cup, an inter-regional competition organized by the RFEF. In the tournament, he formed a partnership with his fellow Athletic teammates Goyarrola and Buylla.

When he joined Racing de Santander, he become eligible to play for the Cantabria national team, and he was one of the eleven footballers that played in the team's first-ever game on 9 March 1924, which ended in a 3–0 win over Aragon.

Honours

Club
Racing de Santander
Cantabrian Championship
Champions (5): 1922–23, 1923–24, 1924–25, 1925–26 and 1926–27

International
Madrid
Prince of Asturias Cup:
Champions (1): 1917

References

1899 births
1981 deaths
Spanish footballers
Association football defenders
Atlético Madrid footballers
Footballers from Cantabria
Racing de Santander players
Footballers from Madrid